Gattan-e Olya (also Romanized as Gattān-e ‘Olyā; also known as Bongard, Gatān, Gattān-e Bālā, and Gattān-e Nābī) is a village in Kangan Rural District, in the Central District of Jask County, Hormozgan Province, Iran. At the 2006 census, its population was 547, in 102 families.

References 

Populated places in Jask County